Brennan Elliott (born March 24, 1975) is a Canadian actor, best known for his role as Dr. Nick Biancavilla in the Lifetime medical drama series, Strong Medicine (2000-2004). Elliott later had recurring roles on The 4400, Cedar Cove and UnREAL.

Early life
Elliott was born in Calgary, Alberta, Canada of Clan Eliott. His father's family originated in North of Ireland. He was educated at the prestigious Actors Studio at the Juilliard School in New York City.  One of Elliott's first screen appearances was in the music video for Tom Cochrane's 1991 song Life is a Highway.

Career
Elliott is best known as Dr. Nick Biancavilla in Lifetime's Strong Medicine. Among his most prominent roles are his leading roles in the 1999 movie The Silencer and G-Saviour from 2000. Additionally, he had a role in the horror film, Curse of Chucky and a cameo role in the 2014 film Night at the Museum: Secret of the Tomb.

After appearing in episodes of Canadian television series like Madison, Viper, The Outer Limits, Welcome to Paradox, First Wave, The Net and Poltergeist: The Legacy in the 1990s, Elliott has appeared in episodes of American television series like Monk, House M.D., Criminal Minds, CSI: Crime Scene Investigation, The 4400, Cold Case, What About Brian, Castle and Desperate Housewives. Elliott appeared on Grey's Anatomy as the father of a son who is a drug abuser. He made appearances in the series Ghost Whisperer and Private Practice and starred as 9/11 hero Todd Beamer in Flight 93.

In 2013, Elliott began starring as Warren Saget on the Hallmark Channel series, Cedar Cove. In 2015, he was cast in the recurring role of reality dating show host Graham in the Lifetime drama series, UnREAL.

Personal life 
In September 2011, Elliott married psychologist Camilla Row. They have two children.

Filmography

References

External links
 Official Website
 

1975 births
Living people
Canadian male film actors
Canadian male television actors
Male actors from Calgary